The Clark–Chalker House is a historic home in the Middleburg Historic District in Middleburg, Florida, located at 3891 Main Street. On October 5, 1988, it was added to the U.S. National Register of Historic Places.

History
Built in 1835, the house may have been the site of Fort Heileman's (c. 1835-1842) army hospital. The house was purchased by Isaac Varnes in 1845, and then by William Sims Bardin in 1859. Bardin's daughter, Martha Anne, married Albert Chalker in December 1865; Chalker was a veteran of the American Civil War, having served under Captain J.J. Dickison in the Second Florida Cavalry. 

The Clark-Chalker House was located along the route of the Federal Military Road, of which Main Street was part; the Federal Road began in Colerain, Georgia and ran south through Garey's Ferry (Middleburg) and concluding in Tampa.

Notability as historic landmark
It was deemed notable as it "was one of the original houses built in the town of Middleburg and was associated with two of the pioneer families of the
town for almost a hundred years."

In the 1980s the home was purchased by a local family (Gaudet) and served as their primary residence until the early 1990s. While owned by the Gaudet family, the building was added to the national historical register. During the Gaudet period of ownership, the property was bisected creating the address 3893 Main street. The purpose of this change was to accommodate another historic building being added to the property. The building added was the original Middleburg Masonic lodge that was scheduled for demolition. The then owner of the Chalker house, Larry Gaudet, hoping to preserve the lodge building, purchased the building from the masonic organization and had it moved to the Chalker property. The building was then restored and served as a part-time residence for the family until such time as both properties were sold in the early 1990s.

References

External links
 Clay County listings at National Register of Historic Places
 Clay County listings at Florida's Office of Cultural and Historical Programs

National Register of Historic Places in Clay County, Florida
Houses on the National Register of Historic Places in Florida
Houses completed in 1835
Houses in Clay County, Florida